César Augusto Curti (born March 19, 1987) is a Brazilian model and male pageant winner who was crowned Mister International 2011 at Patravadi Theatre in The Garden, Bangkok, Thailand. He is the second Brazilian to get title of Mister International in the history of the pageant.

Pageantry

Mister Brasil 2011
Curti was crowned as Mister Brazil International 2011 and competed at Mister International 2011 in Thailand.

Mister International 2011
Curti was crowned as Mister International 2011 at Patravadi Theatre in The Garden, Bangkok, Thailand on December 17, 2011. He competed against 32 contestants at the pageant to get the title of Mister International.

Later career
In 2012, Curti competed on and won The Amazing Race: Edição Brasil with his friend Daniel Belém. In 2015, Curti created his own mix of meditation and martial arts, named Mahamudra (following the homonymous Buddhist concept).

References

External links
 Official Mister International website
 Mahamudra Brasil official website

Mister International
1987 births
Brazilian male models
Living people
Brazilian beauty pageant winners
Male beauty pageant winners
The Amazing Race contestants
Reality show winners